A special election was held on June 1, 2021, to fill the vacancy in New Mexico's 1st congressional district created by Representative Deb Haaland's resignation from the United States House of Representatives to become the Secretary of the Interior in Joe Biden's administration.

State Representatives Patricia Roybal Caballero, Georgene Louis and Melanie Stansbury and state Senator Antoinette Sedillo Lopez sought the Democratic nomination. State Senator Mark Moores, radio host Eddy Aragon and activist Elisa Martinez sought the Republican nomination.

The Democratic Party nominated Stansbury, the Republican Party nominated Moores, the Libertarian Party selected Chris Manning; former Commissioner of Public Lands Aubrey Dunn Jr. ran as an independent. Stansbury won the election with over 60% percent of the vote.

Background
Representative Michelle Lujan Grisham of New Mexico's 1st congressional district announced in 2016, that she would seek the Democratic nomination for the 2018 gubernatorial election. Deb Haaland, the former chair of the Democratic Party of New Mexico, ran for the seat with the Democratic nomination and won in the 2018 election. She was reelected in the 2020 election.

Haaland was selected by President Joe Biden to serve as Secretary of the Interior and she was approved by the United States Senate by a vote of fifty-one to forty. Haaland resigned from her seat on March 16, 2021, and a special election was ordered by the Secretary of State of New Mexico to be held on June 1. Each party's state central committee selected their candidate for the special election instead of using a primary system.

Democratic committee selection

Antoinette Sedillo Lopez, a member of the New Mexico Senate who had run in the 2018 Democratic primary for the seat, and Melanie Stansbury, a member of the New Mexico House of Representatives, announced on December 21, 2020, that they would seek the Democratic nomination for the special election. On January 4, 2021, Georgene Louis, a member of the state house, announced that she would seek the Democratic nomination. Victor Reyes, the legislator director for Governor Lujan Grisham, announced on January 8, that he would seek the Democratic nomination. Patricia Roybal Caballero, a member of the state house, announced her campaign on January 27.

Stansbury won the nomination after defeating Sedillo Lopez, who had placed first in the first round of voting, in the runoff.

Candidates

Selected
Melanie Stansbury, state representative

Eliminated in second round
Antoinette Sedillo Lopez, state senator and candidate for New Mexico's 1st congressional district in 2018

Eliminated in first round
Francisco Fernández, filmmaker
Selinda Guerrero, community organizer
Georgene Louis, state representative
Randi McGinn, attorney
Victor Reyes, legislative director for Governor of New Mexico Michelle Lujan Grisham
Patricia Roybal Caballero, state representative

Declined
Javier Martínez, state representative
Maggie Toulouse Oliver, New Mexico Secretary of State

Endorsements

Convention results

Republican committee selection

State Senator Mark Moores was selected by the Republican state central committee to serve as the Republican candidate in the special election on March 27.

Candidates

Selected
Mark Moores, state senator

Not selected
Eddy Aragon, radio host and owner of KIVA-AM
Michaela Chavez, bookkeeper
Ronnie Lucero, finance manager
Elisa Martinez, anti-abortion activist and candidate for U.S. Senate in 2020
Tracy Trujillo
Jared Vander Dussen, attorney

Withdrew before committee selection
Michelle Garcia Holmes, retired police detective, nominee for Lieutenant Governor of New Mexico in 2018, and nominee for this district in 2020

Endorsements

Convention results

Libertarian committee selection

Candidates

Selected
Chris Manning, staff auditor, Arizona National Guard veteran, and Libertarian candidate for New Mexico's 3rd congressional district in 2018

Independents

Aubrey Dunn Jr., who had served as the New Mexico Commissioner of Public Lands as a Republican and Libertarian, filed to run as an independent for the seat on January 8, 2021. Two other candidates, Laura Olivas and Robert Ornelas, ran as write-in candidates.

Candidates

Declared
Aubrey Dunn Jr., former Republican-turned-Libertarian New Mexico Commissioner of Public Lands (2015–2019), Republican candidate for New Mexico's 2nd congressional district in 2018, and Libertarian candidate for U.S. Senate in 2018

Certified write-in
 Laura Olivas
 Robert Ornelas, perennial candidate (previously associated with the American Independent Party)

Endorsements

General election

Predictions

Endorsements

Polling

Results

By county

See also
2021 United States House of Representatives elections

References

External links
Official websites for candidates
 Aubrey Dunn Jr. (I) for Congress
 Chris Manning (L) for Congress 
 Mark Moores (R) for Congress
 Melanie Stansbury (D) for Congress

New Mexico 2021 01
New Mexico 2021 01
2021 01 Special
New Mexico 01 Special
United States House of Representatives 01 Special
United States House of Representatives 2021 01